St Luke's Church, Cannock is a Grade II* listed parish church in Cannock, Staffordshire, England. It is the an active place of worship and community hub in the town centre.

History

St Luke's Church dates from the 12th century but was enlarged in the 14th century with the addition of nave arcades and the tower. It was extended again at the east end by Nicholas Joyce of Stafford between 1878 and 1882 who added two additional bays to the nave and aisles. A chapel of 1949 was built as a war memorial and the classical porch was replaced in 1957.

Organ

The church has an organ which originally was built by Norman and Beard in 1914. A specification of the organ can be found on the National Pipe Organ Register.

See also
Grade II* listed buildings in Cannock Chase (district)
Listed buildings in Cannock

References

Church of England church buildings in Staffordshire
Grade II* listed churches in Staffordshire
Cannock